Kirby Kali Yates (born March 25, 1987) is an American professional baseball pitcher for the Atlanta Braves of Major League Baseball (MLB). He has previously played in MLB for the Tampa Bay Rays, Los Angeles Angels, New York Yankees, and San Diego Padres. He made his MLB debut in 2014, and was an All-Star in 2019, when he led the National League in saves.

Early career

Yates was drafted by the Boston Red Sox in the 26th round of the 2005 Major League Baseball draft out of Kauai High School in  Lihue, Hawaii. He did not sign and attended Yavapai College. He missed both the 2006 and 2007 seasons due to Tommy John surgery.

Professional career

Tampa Bay Rays
After going undrafted in 2009, Yates signed with the Tampa Bay Rays. In 2012, Yates reached the Double-A level with the Montgomery Biscuits, where he had a 2.65 ERA and 94 strikeouts in 68 innings over 50 games.  Yates was a Triple-A All-Star in 2013, putting up a 1.90 ERA in 51 games for the Durham Bulls.

Yates was added to the Rays 40-man roster on November 20, 2013. Yates was called up to the majors for the first time on June 7, 2014 and made his debut that day. In 37 games, he posted an ERA of 3.75 in 36 innings, striking out 42. The following season he struggled, posting an ERA of 7.97 in  innings for the Major League club as he shuttled back and forth between Tampa and Durham. The Rays designated Yates for assignment after the 2015 season.

New York Yankees
On November 25, 2015, the Rays traded Yates to the Cleveland Indians for cash considerations. Yates was subsequently designated for assignment on January 5, 2016. On January 8, 2016, the Indians traded Yates to the New York Yankees in exchange for cash considerations. Yates made the Yankees' Opening Day roster in 2016. Yates pitched in relief for the Yankees for most of the season, although he was optioned to Triple-A Scranton/Wilkes-Barre on June 28, and then recalled on August 17.  In 41 games for the Yankees, he posted an ERA of 5.23 and 50 strikeouts in  innings.

Los Angeles Angels
After the 2016 season, the Los Angeles Angels claimed Yates from the Yankees on waivers. He was designated for assignment on April 2, 2017, after failing to secure a spot in the Angels bullpen during spring training, and he was outrighted from the 40-man roster and sent to the Triple-A Salt Lake Bees after clearing waivers on April 5. Yates made his Angels debut as a reliever on April 22 against the Toronto Blue Jays but was designated for assignment the next day.

San Diego Padres 
On April 26, 2017, Yates was claimed off waivers by the San Diego Padres. He excelled relieving for the Padres, striking out 87 in  innings and going 4–5 with a 3.72 ERA in 61 games. Yates credited his success to the development of a split-finger fastball in the spring which he began throwing more often with the Padres.

In 2018, Yates began the season as the setup man to closer Brad Hand. He briefly went to the disabled list in early April with an ankle injury, but returned after two weeks.  At the trade deadline, the Padres traded Hand, thus handing over the closer role to Yates. He ended the season with a career low 2.14 ERA in 65 appearances. He was 12 for 13 in save opportunities and struck out 90 in 63 innings.

In 2019, Yates was selected as the Padres' sole representative at the All-Star Game. For the season, he led all major league pitchers in saves, with 41. He also recorded a 1.19 ERA and struck out 101 batters in  innings.

Yates' 2020 season was cut short due to injury, as he ended the season with only six appearances.

Toronto Blue Jays
On January 20, 2021, Yates signed a one-year, $5.5 million contract with the Toronto Blue Jays. On March 22, 2021, Yates was diagnosed with a flexor strain and it was later announced that he would likely undergo Tommy John surgery, ending his 2021 season. On March 24, 2021, Yates underwent the procedure. He was placed on the 60-day injured list on April 4.

Atlanta Braves
On November 29, 2021, Yates signed a two-year, $8.25 million contract with the Atlanta Braves. 

On July 16, 2022, he pitched a perfect inning in the Florida Complex League. It was his first game at any level since August 2020.

International career
At the conclusion of the 2018 season, Yates was selected to represent Major League Baseball at the 2018 MLB Japan All-Star Series

Personal life
His brother, Tyler Yates, also played in Major League Baseball. Tyler has since been a police officer in Kauai.

Yates married his long time girlfriend Ashlee on January 2, 2016. She owns a business that places sitters with professional athlete families, Homerun Sitters LLC. His hobbies include surfing and golfing.

See also

List of Major League Baseball annual saves leaders

References

External links

1987 births
Living people
Atlanta Braves players
Baseball players from Hawaii
Bowling Green Hot Rods players
Charlotte Stone Crabs players
Durham Bulls players
Florida Complex League Braves players
Gulf Coast Rays players
Los Angeles Angels players
Major League Baseball pitchers
Montgomery Biscuits players
National League All-Stars
New York Yankees players
People from Kauai County, Hawaii
People from Lihue, Hawaii
Phoenix Desert Dogs players
Princeton Rays players
Salt Lake Bees players
San Diego Padres players
Scranton/Wilkes-Barre RailRiders players
Surprise Saguaros players
Tampa Bay Rays players
Yavapai Roughriders baseball players